"Wonder Woman" is a song by Trey Songz, released in February 2007 as the first single from the album Trey Day. The song was written by Trey Songz along with Danja, who also produced the single.

A remix was made with female Dipset member Jha Jha and rapper Big Kuntry King.

Music video
The music video debuted on BET's Access Granted on April 4, 2007. It was directed by Little X, and features Fershgenet Melaku a.k.a. LoLa Monroe and Drake who makes a cameo appearance.

Charts

References

2006 songs
2007 singles
Trey Songz songs
Atlantic Records singles
Music videos directed by Director X
Song recordings produced by Danja (record producer)
Songs written by Danja (record producer)
Songs written by Trey Songz